Karsten Mosebach (born 1969) is a German photographer and teacher.

Life 
Mosebach was born in Homberg (Efze). After graduating from high school, he studied chemistry and geography at the University of Münster to become a teacher. After the end of his studies and his legal clerkship, he worked for Tecklenborg Verlag for one year as an editor for the magazine NaturFoto.

He runs the student company Foto AG in the grammar school, which photographs several times in parliaments (European Parliament, Bundestag) members of parliament for Wikipedia, which is also often used outside of Wikipedia.

Mosebach works regularly for two different photo magazines and is active as a landscape and animal photographer. Together with other authors and photographers, Mosebach has published 10 books to date and works as a speaker.

The filmmakers Svenja Schieke and Ralph Schieke accompanied Mosebach for a total of 15 months as part of a NDR documentary NaturNah Der Eulenmann. In addition to being broadcast on NDR, the documentary has since been shown at film festivals.

Awards and honors 

 Nature Photographer of the Year 2011 of the Society of German Animal Photographers
 Nature Photographer of the Year 2016: 1st place in the category Landscapes
 Fritz-Pölking Prize (2017)
 Photo competition 2018 of the Swiss Ornithological Institute
 Nature Photographer of the Year 2020: 2nd place in the category Birds

Bibliography

References

External links 

 

1969 births
Living people
Landscape photographers
21st-century German photographers
Photographers from Hesse
German photojournalists
People from Homberg (Efze)
People from Osnabrück (district)
German schoolteachers